This is a list of Singaporean dishes.

Singaporean cuisine includes both unique dishes and others that, while sharing names with dishes in other cuisines, have evolved to mean something distinctly different in Singapore.

Noodle dishes

Main dishes

Snacks and desserts

Beverages

References

Singaporean